James Michael Clarke (6 October 1874 – 29 December 1929) was an Irish tug of war competitor who competed in the 1908 Summer Olympics.

He was from Bohola in county Mayo and was a cousin of Martin Sheridan and competed against his cousin during the Tug of War event at the 1908 London Olympics, in which he won the silver medal as member of the British team Liverpool Police.

References

External links
profile

1874 births
1929 deaths
Olympic tug of war competitors of Great Britain
Tug of war competitors at the 1908 Summer Olympics
Olympic silver medallists for Great Britain
Olympic medalists in tug of war
British police officers
Medalists at the 1908 Summer Olympics